Lagoaça e Fornos is a civil parish in the municipality of Freixo de Espada à Cinta, Portugal. It was formed in 2013 by the merger of the former parishes Lagoaça and Fornos. The population in 2011 was 617, in an area of 64.27 km².

References

Freguesias of Freixo de Espada à Cinta